Looking for Alibrandi is the debut novel of Australian author Melina Marchetta, published in 1992. A film adaptation of the same name was made in 2000.

Plot
The novel follows its protagonist, Josephine Alibrandi, the Italian-Australian daughter of Italian immigrant parents. Josie lives in Sydney and attends a Catholic high school–where she is disillusioned with the cliques and social politics of her snobby peers. Her usually sophisticated, sassy demeanour is challenged when she is overcome with the pressures of her senior year of high school: the suicide of a male friend, and meeting her estranged father who is in Sydney on a business trip. She confides in a young man with a bad reputation, who slowly turns into a romantic interest for Josie. This relationship, mirrored by the tumultuous relationship with her father, forms the centre complications of the novel as Josie tries to navigate through the complexities and hurdles she faces as a young adult.

Awards
 Won - CBCA Children's Book of the Year Award: Older Readers (1993)
 Won - Books I Love Best Yearly: Older Readers Award (1995)
 Won - Books I Love Best Yearly: Older Readers Award (2000)

Adaptations 
The world premiere of the play Looking for Alibrandi, based on the novel, was created and performed by the PACT Youth Theatre in Sydney in 1995. It sold out for three seasons, leading to the making of a film adaptation.

The film Looking for Alibrandi (2000) starred Pia Miranda as Josephine Alibrandi, Anthony LaPaglia as her father, Michael Andretti, and Kick Gurry as her boyfriend, Jacob Coote. Melina Marchetta wrote the screenplay.

Playwright and comedian Vidya Rajan created another stage adaptation of the novel, which was directed by Stephen Nicolazzo in a production that played at the Malthouse Theatre in Melbourne in July 2022 and then at the Belvoir in Sydney in October.

Footnotes

1992 Australian novels
Australian young adult novels
Australian novels adapted into films
Novels set in Sydney
Novels by Melina Marchetta
Aurealis Award-winning works
CBCA Children's Book of the Year Award-winning works
BILBY Award-winning works
1992 debut novels